The Ambassador of the United Kingdom to Thailand is the United Kingdom's foremost diplomatic representative in Thailand, and head of the UK's diplomatic mission in Thailand. The official title is His Britannic Majesty's Ambassador to the Kingdom of Thailand. The first British Consul to the Kingdom of Siam was appointed in 1856 after the signing of the Anglo-Siamese Treaty of 1855. The Consulate was elevated to a Legation in 1885, and to an Embassy in 1947.

Heads of Mission

Minister Resident and Consul-General

to the King of Siam
 1885–1889: Sir Ernest Satow 
 1889–1894: Cpt. Henry Jones 
 1896–1900: Sir George Greville

Envoy Extraordinary and Minister Plenipotentiary
 1901–1903: Reginald Tower
 1904–1909: Sir Ralph Paget 
 1909–1915: Sir Arthur Peel 
 1915–1919: Sir Herbert Dering
 1919–1921: Richard Seymour
 1921–1926: Sir Robert Greg 
 1926–1928: Sir Sydney Waterlow 
 1928–1929: Sir Charles Wingfield 
 1929–1934: Sir Cecil Dormer 
 1934–1941: Sir Josiah Crosby 
 1941–1945: No representation
 1945–1947: Sir Geoffrey Thompson

Ambassadors 

to the Kingdom of Thailand
 1947–1950: Sir Geoffrey Thompson 
 1950–1951: Sir John Magowan  (appointed in December 1950 but died before he could present his credentials)
 1951–1954: Sir Geoffrey Wallinger 
 1954–1957: Sir Berkeley Gage 
 1957–1961: Sir Richard Whittington 
 1961–1965: Sir Dermot MacDermot 
 1965–1967: Sir Anthony Rumbold 
 1967–1970: Sir Neil Pritchard 
 1970–1973: Sir Arthur de la Mare 
 1973–1978: Sir David Cole 
 1978–1981: Peter Tripp 
 1981–1986: Justin Staples 
 1986–1989: Derek Tonkin 
 1989–1992: Sir Ramsay Melhuish 
 1992–1996: Christian Adams 
 1996–2000: Sir James Hodge 
 2000–2003: Barney Smith 
 2003–2007: David Fall 
 2007–2010: Quinton Quayle
 2010–2012: Asif Ahmad
 2012–2016: Mark Kent

 2016–2021: Brian Davidson

See also
Thailand–United Kingdom relations
Embassy of the United Kingdom, Bangkok

References

External links 
UK in Thailand – British Embassy Bangkok

Thailand
 
United Kingdom